Giuseppe Nicolò Ploner (born January 30, 1959 in Santa Cristina Gherdëina) is a former Italian cross-country skier who competed from 1982 to 1989.

Biography
Ploner won a silver medal in the 4 × 10 km relay at the 1985 FIS Nordic World Ski Championships. His best individual finish was eight in the 15 km event at the 1982 FIS Nordic World Ski Championships. He is member of the Centro Sportivo Carabinieri and of the Sci Club Gardena.

Cross-country skiing results
All results are sourced from the International Ski Federation (FIS).

World Championships
 1 medal – (1 silver)

World Cup

Season standings

Team podiums
 1 podium

Note:  Until the 1999 World Championships and the 1994 Olympics, World Championship and Olympic races were included in the World Cup scoring system.

References

External links
 
 Ploner Giuseppe 

Italian male cross-country skiers
People from Santa Cristina Gherdëina
1959 births
Living people
FIS Nordic World Ski Championships medalists in cross-country skiing
Cross-country skiers of Centro Sportivo Carabinieri
Sportspeople from Südtirol